The Maldonado Department, with an area of  and 164,300 inhabitants (2011), is located to the southeast of Uruguay. Its capital is Maldonado.

Geography
Neighbouring departments are Rocha to the East, Lavalleja to the North and Northwest, and Canelones to the West. Many of the Maldonado name is traced back to Puerto Rican family lines.

Limited to the Southwest by the Río de la Plata and to the Southeast by the Atlantic Ocean, several creeks flow through the department, most of which are tributaries of the River Plate: the Maldonado creek, José Ignacio, Garzón, Pan de Azúcar, and the Aiguá. Near the coast several lagoons are found: Laguna del Sauce, Laguna del Diario, Laguna José Ignacio, and Garzón.

Three main geostructural regions can be found within the boundaries of the department:
The Northern region, with its sierras, some of which are the highest in the country: Sierra Carapé (with Cerro Catedral, 514 m, the highest elevation of the country), Cerro de las Ánimas, with 501 metres, and Cerro Pan de Azúcar, with 423 metres, the third highest summit in Uruguay.
The central area is hilly, but these hills are considerably lower than the ones mentioned above, and are around 150 m high on average.
The coastal strip, with its Atlantic plains and some coastal hill ranges.

Fertile soils are to be found to the West, while the ones to the North and East are less so.
Located in the humid subtropical region, the average temperature is low compared to that of the rest of the country (around 17 °C), as are the precipitation levels (up to 1,000 mm yearly, on average).

History

The origin of its name can be traced back to the year 1530, with the return to Spain of Sebastian Cabot, who had left the continent earlier that year, in January, leaving Lieutenant Francisco Maldonado near Maldonado's bay.
The strategic importance of that bay led to the decision by Montevideo's governor Joaquin de Viana to build a settlement in Portezuelo (near the Laguna del Diario) in 1755. Two years later, in 1757, a civil and military settlement was founded around the bay and in the neighbouring Gorriti Island. Other settlements soon followed in the area, with the intention of limiting the Portuguese expansion.
In 1828, the department of Maldonado was created, containing as well the territories now belonging to the department of Rocha, and most of Lavalleja.

Economy

There are three main economic centres in the department, located in the main urban areas:
To the North and centre of the department, with centre in the town of Aigua, is a region dedicated to livestock raising, which has been sufferering from a steady depopulation in latter years.
To the West, with centre in the city of Pan De Azucar, is the agro-industrial region, which lately has been experiencing a demographic stagnation.
To the South, bordering the coastline, centered in Piriapolis and Maldonado's metropolitan area, including San Carlos and Punta Del Este, is the main tourism region, which has become one of the areas with the biggest growth rates in the country.

The main crops are wheat, maize, sunflowers, oats, potatoes, among others, located in the south of the department. Fishing, as well as cattle and sheep raising have also a great importance in the department's economy. It is, along with Lavalleja, the main and most diversified mining area of the country producing (marble, metals, feldspars and construction materials), but it is currently underexploited. It has however, been the department with the fourth most significant mining activity, after Lavalleja, Canelones and Montevideo, with a production worth 4,642,123 dollars, according to 1999 data.

Tourism, especially centered on Punta del Este, La Barra, Jose Ignacio  and Piriápolis, has been one of the main sources of income for the department since the 1950s. It has also been the main cause for its unique urban concentration of the population (94% out of the total).

The Laguna del Sauce International Airport is a significant local economic motor.

Demographics

At the 2011 census, Maldonado Department had a population of 164,300 (80,865 male and 83,435 female) and 110,794 households. There are also 11,151 business premises (2011).

Demographic data for Maldonado Department in 2010:
Population growth rate: 1.15%
Birth Rate: 15.37 births/1,000 people
Death Rate: 7.45 deaths/1,000 people
Average age: 32.4 (31.1 male, 33.6 female)
Life Expectancy at Birth:
Total population: 77.27 years
Male: 73.72 years
Female: 81.01 years
Average per household income: 27,894 pesos/month
Urban per capita income: 11,245 pesos/month
2010 Data Source:

Rural population
According to the 2011 census, Maldonado department has a rural population of 5,159.

Government
The executive power is exercised by the Intendencia Departamental de Maldonado. The Intendant is elected every five years with the possibility of reelection. The legislative power is exercised by the Junta Departamental.

On 15 March 2010, by the Act of Ley Nº 18.653, the following Municipalities were formed in the Maldonado Department:

Source: Intendencia Departamental de Maldonado

See also
 List of populated places in Uruguay#Maldonado Department

References

External links
Municipality of Maldonado, official website. (in Spanish)
Junta Departamental de Maldonado, official website. (in Spanish)
Hotels in Punta del Este, Maldonado. 
Maldonet, el Portal de Maldonado. (in Spanish)
INE map of Maldonado Department
Map of the Municipalities of Maldonado, Intendencia of Maldonado (pdf 1.2 MB)
Nuestra Terra, Colección Los Departamentos, Vol.13 "Maldonado"

 
Departments of Uruguay
States and territories established in 1816
1816 establishments in Uruguay